Franko B (born in Milan in 1960) is an Italian performance artist based in London, where he has lived since 1979. He studied fine art at Camberwell College of Arts (1986–87), Chelsea College of Art (1987–90) and the Byam Shaw School of Art (1990–91). His work was originally based on the bloody and ritualised violation of his own body. Later on he embraced a wide variety of media including video, photography, painting, installation, and sculpture.

He performed at the ICA, London in 1996 and 2008, the South London Gallery in 1999 and 2004, the Centre of Attention in 2000, Tate Modern in 2002, the Ikon Gallery, Birmingham in 2005, Arnolfini, Bristol in 2007, The Bluecoat Centre, Liverpool in 2008, CENDEAC, Murcia, Spain in 2007 and The Crawford Art Gallery in Cork, Ireland in 2005. He has exhibited work internationally in Zagreb, Mexico City, Milan, Amsterdam, Antwerp, Copenhagen, Madrid, Vienna, Brussels, Warsaw, Dublin and Siena.

From 2009 to 2016 he taught sculpture at the Accademia di Belle Arti di Macerata in Italy. In 2017 he was appointed Professor of Sculpture at Accademia Albertina in Turin. He has also lectured extensively at a number of art schools, including Saint Martin's School of Art; New York University; the Ruskin School of Fine Art, Oxford; Chelsea College of Art, London; Duncan of Jordanstone College of Art, Dundee; DasArts, Amsterdam; Goldsmiths' College of Art, London; Zurich University of the Arts; and the Courtauld Institute of Art.

His work is the subject of four monographs: Franko B (Black Dog Publishing, London, 1998), Oh Lover Boy, (Black Dog Publishing, London, 2000), Blinded by Love (Damiani Editore, Bologna, 2006) and I Still Love (Motta/Il Sole 24 Ore, Milan, 2010).

An archive of materials related to his work is held as part of the University of Bristol's Theatre Collection.

In April 2013, Franko B's work appeared on the cover and insert for the UK Decay album New Hope for the Dead.

Further reading 
 Brayshaw, Teresa, Anna Fenemore, Noel Witts, The Twenty-First Century Performance Reader,  Routledge, New York, 2019
 Doyle, Jennifer, Hold It Against Me: Difficulty and Emotion in Contemporary Art, Duke University Press, Durham, 2013
 Goldberg, RoseLee, Performance: Live Art Since 1960, Thames & Hudson, 1998
 Johnson, Dominic, Franko B: Blinded by Love, Damiani, Bologne, 2006
 Mahon, Alyce, Eroticism and Art, Oxford University Press, 2007
 Vergine, Lea, Body Art and Performance: The Body as Language, Skira, Milan, 2000
 Warr, Tracey and Jones, Amelia, The Artist's Body, Phaidon Press, London, 2000

References 
 

British performance artists
Alumni of Chelsea College of Arts
1960 births
Living people
Italian contemporary artists
English contemporary artists
Body art
Alumni of the Byam Shaw School of Art
Alumni of Camberwell College of Arts
Academic staff of Accademia Albertina